The first season of the American reality competition television series Lego Masters premiered on Fox on February 5, 2020. The series is based on the British series of the same name. The season concluded with 10 episodes on April 15, 2020 crowning married couple Tyler and Amy Clites the winners during the finale.

On November 11, 2020, it was announced that Fox had renewed the series for a second season with Arnett, Berard and Corbett returning.

Host and judges 
The season is hosted by Will Arnett with Jamie Berard and Amy Corbett serving as judges. Various guests were featured in the season including Mayim Bialik in the second episode, Phil Lord and Christopher Miller in the fourth episode, Nicole Byer in the seventh episode and Terry Crews in the eighth episode. Additionally, C-3PO, R2-D2 and BB-8 from the Star Wars franchise were featured in the ninth episode which was themed to the franchise.

Elimination table 

†Team awarded the Golden Brick.

Notes

Episodes

Ratings

References 

2020 American television seasons